DMF may refer to:

Science and technology

Chemistry
 Dimethylformamide, a common solvent
 Dimethyl fumarate, a small molecule anti-inflammatory human medicine
 2,5-Dimethylfuran, a liquid biofuel

Computing
 Distribution Media Format, the computer floppy disk format
 DivX Media Format, the media container format
 Death Master File, a document listing deaths in the US

Medicine
 Decay-missing-filled index for assessing dental caries prevalence as well as dental treatment needs among populations
 Drug Master File, a document in the pharmaceutical industry

Other technology
 Digital microfluidics, a fluid handling technique
 Dual-mass flywheel, a rotating mechanical device

Other uses
 Danish Musicians' Union, a Danish trade union
 Defensive midfielder, in association football